Stirling is a settlement in New Zealand. It is located in South Otago, approximately 5 km from Balclutha, and just north of the Matau Branch of the Clutha River.

Demographics
Stirling is described by Statistics New Zealand as a rural settlement.

Stirling had a population of 321 at the 2018 New Zealand census, an increase of 6 people (1.9%) since the 2013 census, and a decrease of 6 people (−1.8%) since the 2006 census. There were 123 households. There were 168 males and 153 females, giving a sex ratio of 1.1 males per female, with 69 people (21.5%) aged under 15 years, 60 (18.7%) aged 15 to 29, 150 (46.7%) aged 30 to 64, and 45 (14.0%) aged 65 or older.

Ethnicities were 86.9% European/Pākehā, 12.1% Māori, 5.6% Pacific peoples, 0.9% Asian, and 0.9% other ethnicities (totals add to more than 100% since people could identify with multiple ethnicities).

Although some people objected to giving their religion, 58.9% had no religion, 33.6% were Christian and 2.8% had other religions.

Of those at least 15 years old, 24 (9.5%) people had a bachelor or higher degree, and 66 (26.2%) people had no formal qualifications. The employment status of those at least 15 was that 150 (59.5%) people were employed full-time, 39 (15.5%) were part-time, and 6 (2.4%) were unemployed.

Benhar-Stirling statistical area

Benhar-Stirling had a population of 471 at the 2018 New Zealand census, an increase of 9 people (1.9%) since the 2013 census, and an increase of 3 people (0.6%) since the 2006 census. There were 183 households. There were 249 males and 219 females, giving a sex ratio of 1.14 males per female. The median age was 40.7 years (compared with 37.4 years nationally), with 93 people (19.7%) aged under 15 years, 90 (19.1%) aged 15 to 29, 225 (47.8%) aged 30 to 64, and 66 (14.0%) aged 65 or older.

Ethnicities were 86.6% European/Pākehā, 12.7% Māori, 4.5% Pacific peoples, 3.2% Asian, and 1.9% other ethnicities (totals add to more than 100% since people could identify with multiple ethnicities).

The proportion of people born overseas was 14.0%, compared with 27.1% nationally.

Although some people objected to giving their religion, 53.5% had no religion, 36.3% were Christian, 0.6% were Muslim and 2.5% had other religions.

Of those at least 15 years old, 36 (9.5%) people had a bachelor or higher degree, and 93 (24.6%) people had no formal qualifications. The median income was $35,600, compared with $31,800 nationally. 48 people (12.7%) earned over $70,000 compared to 17.2% nationally. The employment status of those at least 15 was that 225 (59.5%) people were employed full-time, 60 (15.9%) were part-time, and 12 (3.2%) were unemployed.

Education

The school opened in 1879 and celebrated a joint centenary with Inch Clutha school in 1958.

References

Populated places in Otago
Clutha District